The Turn of the Tortoise: The Challenge and Promise of India's Future is a 2015 book by T N Ninan, a writer and journalist.

The book analyses the economy of India, trends in politics, China-India relations, the size of the middle class and the Aam Aadmi Party amongst other issues.

Reception
In the Hindustan Times Gaurav Choudhury describes the book as "insightful" and a "useful analytical framework to understand the multiple variables that influence India's economy, polity and society". Economist and author Dr Surjit Bhalla in The Financial Express also praised the book as a "well-documented, thoroughly-researched and extremely well-written book"

References

2015 non-fiction books
Books about politics of India
Books about the economy of India
Books about international relations
Penguin Books India books
21st-century Indian books
Allen Lane (imprint) books